Bror Viking Palm (13 October 1923 – 19 January 2009) was a Swedish light-heavyweight freestyle wrestler. He competed at the 1952, 1956 and 1960 Olympics and won a gold medal in 1952, finishing fourth in 1960. In 1960 his bronze medal match against Anatoly Albul ended in a draw, but Albul had a lower body weight. Palm won two medals at the world championships, in 1951 and 1954.

Palm was born to a farmer and started training in wrestling aged 16, together with his elder brother Evert. He had a long wrestling career and reached the final of his last national championships aged 47. He was a firefighter by profession, but in 1972 began working as a policeman in Solna.

References

1923 births
2009 deaths
People from Östra Göinge Municipality
Olympic wrestlers of Sweden
Wrestlers at the 1952 Summer Olympics
Wrestlers at the 1956 Summer Olympics
Wrestlers at the 1960 Summer Olympics
Swedish male sport wrestlers
Olympic gold medalists for Sweden
Olympic medalists in wrestling
World Wrestling Championships medalists
Medalists at the 1952 Summer Olympics
Sportspeople from Skåne County